Robert Hainsey (born August 12, 1998) is an American football center for the Tampa Bay Buccaneers of the National Football League (NFL). He played college football at Notre Dame. He was a 2020 senior class award finalist and was named to the 2020 All-ACC second team.

Professional career

Hainsey was drafted by the Tampa Bay Buccaneers in the third round, 95th overall, of the 2021 NFL Draft. He signed his four-year rookie contract with Tampa Bay on July 21, 2021.

References

External links

1998 births
Living people
American football offensive tackles
IMG Academy alumni
Notre Dame Fighting Irish football players
Players of American football from Pittsburgh
Tampa Bay Buccaneers players